Cimitra horridella is a moth in the family Tineidae. It is found in South Africa, Uganda, Zimbabwe and Madagascar.

References

Hapsiferinae
Moths described in 1863